The Count of Monte Cristo (French: Le Comte de Monte-Cristo) is a 1954 French-Italian historical drama film directed by Robert Vernay and starring Jean Marais, Lia Amanda and Roger Pigaut. It is based on the 1844 novel of the same title by Alexandre Dumas.

It was first aired in France and Italy, in 1954, in 2 parts.

France : 1) La Trahison, 2) La Vengeance

Italy : 1) Il tesoro di Montecristo, 2) La vendetta di Montecristo

It was shot at the Billancourt Studios in Paris and on location on the Côte d'Azur. The sets were designed by the art director Robert Clavel. It was made in Gevacolor.

Cast 
 Jean Marais as Edmond Dantès / Comte de Monte-Cristo
 Lia Amanda as Mercédès Herrera (1 and 2)
 Roger Pigaut as Fernand Mondego, alias : de Mortcerf, new husband of Mercédès (1 and 2)
 Cristina Grado as Haydée, la jeune esclave (2)
 Jacques Castelot as Gérard Noirtier, alias M. de Villefort, procureur du roi (1 and 2)
 Daniel Ivernel as Gaspard Caderousse, le second d'Edmond sur le bateau (1 and 2)
 Claude Génia as la Carconte, la femme de Caderousse (1)
 Jean Témerson as le roi Louis XVIII
 Louis Seigner as M. Joannès, le bijoutier Parisien (1)
 Noël Roquevert as M. Noirtier, le père de Gérard (1)
 Folco Lulli as Jacopo, le capitaine du bateau au large du château d'If (1 and 2)
 Paolo Stoppa as Bertuccio, l'ancien amant de La Picard (2)
 Julien Bertheau as Napoléon Ier (1)
 Lucien Blondeau as Dantès père (1) 
 André Brunot as L'armateur Morel (1) 
 Gualtiero Tumiati as L'abbé Faria (1) 
 Simone Paris as Émilienne de Beaugency (2) 
 Genica Athanasiou as Fatima (2) 
 Daniel Cauchy as Bruno 
 Jean-Pierre Mocky as Albert de Morcerf (2) 
 Marcel Journet as Le président de la chambre des Pairs (2)
 Paul Azaïs as Un argousin
 Cristina Grado as Haydée

References

Bibliography
 Roy Kinnard & Tony Crnkovich. Italian Sword and Sandal Films, 1908–1990. McFarland, 2017.

External links 
 
 Le Comte de Monte-Cristo (1954) at the Films de France

1954 films
French historical drama films
French historical romance films
French romantic drama films
1950s French-language films
Films directed by Robert Vernay
1954 romantic drama films
1950s historical drama films
Films based on The Count of Monte Cristo
Films released in separate parts
Italian historical drama films
Films shot at Billancourt Studios
Lux Film films
1950s French films
1950s Italian films